Brian Leslie Cole (September 8, 1942 – August 2, 1972) was the bass guitarist, bass vocalist and one of the founding members of the 1960s folk rock band the Association.

Early Life 
Brian Cole was born in Tacoma, Washington to Perry Anthony Cole and Violet Elanor Cole. Before working as a musician, he was an actor and comedian.

The Association 
In 1966, Cole co-founded the folk rock band The Association. The Association are best known for their songs “Cherish”, “Along Comes Mary”, “Windy” and “Never My Love”. The Association were an opening act at the Monterey Pop Festival.

The group were known for their harmonies. Brian sang bass vocals in their songs.

Cole rarely sang lead, most notably singing lead on the song "Reputation", featured on the Association's 1967 album Insight Out.

Personal Life 
He has three sons, Jordan, Chandler, and Brant. Jordan Cole is now a member of the Association, and has provided keyboards, guitar, vocals and drums since 1999. Brant Cole is a drummer for the Los Angeles-based band Briana and the Fates.

Death 
Cole became a heavy drug user in his final years and died in Los Angeles of a heroin overdose at the age of 29, a few weeks before his 30th birthday. Cole’s last release with the Association was their album, Waterbeds in Trinidad!, which was released four months prior.

Discography

Albums
 And Then... Along Comes the Association (1966)
 Renaissance (1966)
 Insight Out (1967)
 Birthday (1968)
 The Association (1969)
 Stop Your Motor (1971)
 Waterbeds in Trinidad! (1972)

Singles

See also
List of basses in non-classical music

References 

1942 births
1972 deaths
American rock bass guitarists
American male bass guitarists
American rock singers
American male pop singers
Deaths by heroin overdose in California
Musicians from Tacoma, Washington
20th-century American bass guitarists
Drug-related deaths in California
20th-century American singers
The Association members
20th-century American male singers
Leodis V. McDaniel High School alumni